Gideon Kailipalaki-o-Kinaʻu Keheananui Laʻanui (1840–1871) was a  great grandnephew of Kamehameha the Great, being a great grandson of Kalokuokamaile, the eldest brother of Kamehameha the Great. He was a member of the royal House of Laʻanui, a collateral branch of the House of Kamehameha.

Life 
He was born in January 1840 at the home of his father's Waialua estate. He was named Gideon after his father Gideon Laʻanui I, and Kailipalakai o Kinaʻu Keheananui, after High Chief Kinau II, his name was given because he used to brush the skin of Kinaʻu with a brush, reviling Dr. Judd which almost caused his death. 
His older sister Elizabeth Kekaʻaniau attended the Chiefs' Children's School, a select school exclusive for the children of the highest rank in the kingdom, eligible to be rulers. Under an official order of King Kamehameha III, she was proclaimed eligible to rule the Hawaiian Kingdom. He was too young to attend, and the school closed in 1849. However, Gideon attended the day school (also called Royal School) ran by Rev. Edward G. Beckwith with the future monarchs Kalākaua and Liliuokalani. He and his sister Elizabeth were only part native Hawaiian (hapa) with the same amount of Hawaiian blood as Queen Emma because their mother Theresa Owana Kaheiheimalie Rives was half French, daughter of Kamehameha II's French secretary Jean Baptiste Rives.

He became overseer of the royal properties on the island of Oʻahu and supplier of food for the royal court. By his marriage to Elizabeth Kamaikaopa Ka-o-paikawekiu-o-kalani July 12, 1859, they had one daughter, Theresa Owana Kaohelelani Laʻanui (1860–1944). It was reported that Gideon killed his wife (who was known for her beauty) with a pickaxe, but his high status prevented any legal action.
Laʻanui died July 26, 1871 at the age of 31.

Family

Ancestry

Family tree

References

External links 
 

1840 births
1871 deaths
Royalty of the Hawaiian Kingdom
House of Kalokuokamaile
Royal School (Hawaii) alumni
Hawaiian Kingdom people of French descent